First Day High is a 2006 Philippine comedy film starring Geoff Eigenmann, Jason Abalos and Maja Salvador with Gerald Anderson and Kim Chiu in their film debut. This film is released under Star Cinema and the movie adaptation of the Rexona First Day High TV commercial. The original actors in the commercial were also part of the cast.

Plot
The film begins when Brainy Indy (Kim Chiu), MVP MJ2 (Gerald Anderson), Sosy Pre (Maja Salvador), Rebel Gael (Geoff Eigenmann) and Nice Guy Nathan (Jason Abalos) are college freshmen who enter FDH University, until they all got involved in the biggest mystery the university has ever encountered- the Basketball Water Contamination Accident.

Cast

Main cast
Jason Abalos as Nathan "Nat-Nat" Matriponio
Kim Chiu as Indira "Indi" Dela Concepcion
Gerald Anderson as Michael Jordan "MJ2" Ramirez
Maja Salvador as Precious Princess Jewel "Pré" Samartino
Geoff Eigenmann as Gael Zantua

Supporting cast
Bembol Roco as Imbestigador Matriponio
Kat Alano as Ashley
Michael de Mesa as Coach Zantua
Cherry Pie Picache as Indi's Mom
Gardo Versoza as Rene Samartino
Arlene Muhlach as Tassing Samartino
Johnny Delgado† as Bossing (Uncredited)
Rich Alvarez as MJ1 Ramirez
Patty Laurel as Maya
Charles Lejano as Enzo
Carla Humphries as Kristen
Denise Laurel as Tuesday
Bodjie Pascua as Chairman Silla
Sienna Olaso as Principal Bernadette
Ilonah Jean as June Matriponio
Jamie Wilson as Asst. Coach
Ketchup Eusebio as Mascot
Hyubs Azarcon as Insan
Empoy Marquez as Fanatic Guy/Tour Guide
Boy2 Quizon as Pepe

Guest cast
Miles Ocampo as young Precious Princess Jewel Pré Samartino
Igi Boy Flores as young Nathan ″″Nat- Nat″″ Matriponio

External links

2006 films
Films directed by Mario Cornejo
Philippine comedy films
2000s Tagalog-language films
Star Cinema films
2006 comedy films